Marshall Soper, born 12 May 1960, is a former football (soccer) and Australia International.

A bustling but skilful centre-forward with a reputation for hot-headedness, he was originally from the Hunter region, 2 hours north of Sydney. In 1981 he was signed by APIA Leichhardt, helping them win the 1982 NSL Cup. In 1983 he was signed by their local rivals Sydney Olympic where he would spend the next 7 seasons and where he would make his name as a player, he scored 60 goals in 151 appearances in all competitions for the club between 1983 and 1989, in the process becoming a household name and star for the Socceroos.

After finishing up with Olympic, Soper also played an important role during a successful period at Parramatta FC, helping the club win the 1991 NSL Cup.

At a national level, Soper played 29 times for the Socceroos, scoring four goals, mostly in "XI" matches against club teams.

In 1991, he top scored (11 goals) for Penang FA in the Malaysian Premier League.

Soper trialled with Arsenal FC.

In later years he coached the Fairfield Bulls and Illawarra Lions.

In late 2010 it was announced that he would become a coach for Newcastle United Jets. Soper then moved to a team in the Illawarra Premier League the Coniston Lions FC to become their club coaching director before accepting the post at his former club Perak FA as their academy head coach in April 2013.

References

External links
 OzFootball profile

1960 births
Living people
Australian soccer players
Australian expatriate soccer players
Australia international soccer players
National Soccer League (Australia) players
APIA Leichhardt FC players
Bonnyrigg White Eagles FC players
Marconi Stallions FC players
Parramatta FC players
Sydney Olympic FC players
Wollongong Wolves FC players
Perak F.C. players
Penang F.C. players
Expatriate footballers in Malaysia
Expatriate footballers in England
Association football forwards